SP-2000 may refer to:

 Frontier SP-2000, a professional film scanner manufactured by Fujifilm
 Australian Lightwing SP-2000 Speed, Australian light aircraft